Ischnognatha leucapera is a moth of the family Erebidae first described by Paul Dognin in 1914. It is found in Colombia.

References

Phaegopterina
Moths described in 1914